West Stewartstown is a census-designated place in the town of Stewartstown in Coös County, New Hampshire, United States. It had a population of 263 at the 2020 census, down from 386 at the 2010 census.

Geography
It is located along U.S. Route 3 and the Connecticut River in the northwestern corner of Stewartstown, directly across the river from Canaan, Vermont, and one mile south of the Canada–US border. Route 3 leads south  to Colebrook and northeast  to Pittsburg.

Demographics

As of the census of 2010, there were 386 people, 119 households, and 76 families residing in the CDP. There were 140 housing units, of which 21, or 15.0%, were vacant. The racial makeup of the CDP was 98.7% white, 0.3% African American, 0.3% Native American, and 0.8% two or more races. None of the population were Hispanic or Latino of any race.

Of the 119 households in the CDP, 31.9% had children under the age of 18 living with them, 45.4% were headed by married couples living together, 9.2% had a female householder with no husband present, and 36.1% were non-families. 28.6% of all households were made up of individuals, and 10.1% were someone living alone who was 65 years of age or older. The average household size was 2.39, and the average family size was 2.91.

18.4% of residents in the CDP were under the age of 18, 10.4% were from age 18 to 24, 19.6% were from 25 to 44, 21.9% were from 45 to 64, and 29.8% were 65 years of age or older. The median age was 46.8 years. For every 100 females, there were 94.0 males. For every 100 females age 18 and over, there were 95.7 males.

For the period 2011–15, the estimated median annual income for a household was $32,083, and the median income for a family was $45,417. The per capita income for the CDP was $18,406.

References

External links
 Coös County: Department of Corrections

Census-designated places in New Hampshire
Census-designated places in Coös County, New Hampshire